Ferlazzo is a surname. Notable people with the surname include:

Alexander Ferlazzo (born 1995), Australian luger 
Steve Ferlazzo, American keyboard player